Elena Alekseyevna Makarova (born 1 February 1973), is a former Russian professional tennis player.

Makarova played in the WTA Tour between 1991 and 1999. Her best performances were in 1995, when she was ranked world No. 36 in doubles, and in 1996, when she was ranked No. 43 in singles.
She as of 2011 coached Russian tennis player Margarita Gasparyan.

WTA Tour finals

Singles: 2 (2 runner-ups)

Doubles: 1 (1 title)

ITF Circuit finals

Singles: 11 finals (6 titles, 5 runner-ups)

Doubles: 8 finals (6 titles, 2 runner-ups)

Head vs. head
 Lindsay Davenport: 0-3
 Venus Williams: 1-0
 Arantxa Sánchez Vicario: 1-2
 Dominique Monami: 0-1
 Martina Hingis: 0-1

Junior Grand Slam finals

Girls' singles: 1 (1 runner-up)

Legacy
In Russia, despite her modest popularity as a top-50 player, Makarova is well-known for providing her locally much-quoted 1990s explanation for the issue of LGBT-athletes being more common amongst female tennis players than on the ATP Tour. She said the following: “When you get tired after a match or training, you no longer want to dress up or go to a party. Therefore, some tennis players solve the problem of sex [absence] by means of "lesser bloodshed" [local idiom which means "easy" in a dual meaning: the simpler the better or silly] — with each other. Besides, you can't afford to take your beloved man with you — he has to work himself". The last part has been clarified to mean that "most female tennis players cannot afford traveling with their beloved man financially".

References

External links
 
 
 

1973 births
Living people
Olympic tennis players of Russia
Russian female tennis players
Tennis players at the 1996 Summer Olympics
Soviet female tennis players